Below is a list of newspapers published in Cambodia.

Newspapers 
 CambodgeMag (French)
The Cambodian Journal (English)
 The Cambodia Daily (English)
 Khmer Times  (English)
 Koh Santepheap Daily (Khmer), founded in 1967
 Moneaksekar Khmer (Khmer)
 The Nation Post (Khmer)
 The Phnom Penh Post (English)
 The Phnom Penh WEEK (English)
 Rasmei Kampuchea Daily (Khmer)
 Sneha Cheat (Khmer)
 The Southeast Asia Weekly (English)
 Sralanh Khmer (Khmer)
 Thngay Pram Py Makara News
 The Voice of Khmer Youth (Khmer)

See also 
 Mass media in Cambodia

References 
Newspapers List of Cambodia

Cambodia
Newspapers